The 2005 Individual Ice Speedway World Championship was the 40th edition of the World Championship  The Championship was held as a Grand Prix series over six rounds.

Classification

See also 
 2005 Speedway Grand Prix in classic speedway
 2005 Team Ice Racing World Championship

References 

Ice speedway competitions
World